Makedonikos Foufas Football Club is a Greek football club based in Foufas, Kozani.

Honours

Domestic titles and honors
 Kozani FCA Champions: 5
 1991–92, 2003–04, 2007–08, 2015–16, 2021-22
 Kozani FCA Cup Winners: 6
 2008–09, 2013–14, 2014–15, 2017–18, 2018-19, 2019-20

Football clubs in Central Macedonia
Kozani (regional unit)
Association football clubs established in 1977
1977 establishments in Greece
Gamma Ethniki clubs